Peru and its two OTI member stations, Panamericana TV and América Televisión, began their participation in the OTI Festival in 1972, in Madrid with Betty Missiego, who would represent Spain in the Eurovision Song Contest seven years later. 

Although the Peruvian debut in the Latin American song contest was apparently well received, her song "Recuerdos de un adiós" (Memories of a goodbye) didn't convince the juries and ended third to last.

Peru never won the OTI festival, but during their uninterrupted participation the country achieved many successes and placed in the top 10 several times.

History 
Even though the debut of Peru in the festival was not successful, the following entries, which were selected internally, were much more promising. In fact, one year later, in Belo Horizonte, the performer Gabriela de Jesús, placed second with her song "El mundo gira por tu amor" (The world turns thanks to your love). 

In 1977, again in Madrid, the singer Cecilia Bracamonte managed to place sixth for Peru with her song "Lando" which turned into a hit in the South American country. 

Some years later, in 1982, when Lima, the Peruvian capital city, hosted the event for first time, the singer Elsa María Elejalde managed again to take the country to the top 10 with a seventh place. 

In 1988, in Buenos Aires, the singer Rocky Belmonte achieved third place for Peru with the song "Partiré Buscaré" (I will depart, I will search) and in 1996 in Quito, the Peruvian broadcaster ended in the same place with Carmina Cannavino and her song "Bendito amor" (Blessed love). The last Peruvian representative in the event was Anna Carina, who, although she didn't manage to reach the top 10, turned into a well known personality in the Andean country.

Contestants 

Rocky Belmonte, who represented Perú in the OTI Festival in 1988, placing third, returned to the event in 1994 in, Valencia with his song "Mía" (Mine) getting the 12th place.

References 

OTI Festival
Peruvian culture